Gordon Crosdale (14 July 1880 – 12 September 1954) was an English first-class cricketer active in 1905 who played for Middlesex as a wicketkeeper. He was born in Islington; attended Charterhouse School; died in Newbury.

References

1880 births
1954 deaths
English cricketers
Middlesex cricketers